Nuijamaa Church is an Evangelical Lutheran church in the Nuijamaa district of Lappeenranta, Finland. The church was opened in December 1948. The church is located only a couple of hundred meters from the Finnish–Russian border.

The church is listed as a nationally significant built heritage site by the Finnish National Board of Antiquities.

See also
 Lauritsala Church
 St. Mary's Church of Lappee

References

External links
 
 Official site (in Finnish)

Lappeenranta
Lutheran churches in Finland
National Romantic architecture in Finland
Churches completed in 1948
20th-century churches in Finland
20th-century Lutheran churches